Robert Dafford (born May 14, 1951) is an American muralist.

Life and work
Robert Dafford is a current resident of Lafayette, Louisiana. He has painted over 400 works of public art across the United States, Canada, France, Belgium, and England. He has been painting murals, signs, and fine art paintings for 35 years.

In the past fifteen years, Dafford has concentrated on working along the Ohio River, painting over two hundred large historical images of cities on their floodwalls, using trompe-l'œil, advanced perspective, and realist technique. Many riverboat tours make stops along the Ohio River specifically to see his murals. Dafford is best known for his murals in Paducah, Kentucky; Portsmouth, Ohio; and Covington, Kentucky. His giant Clarinet in New Orleans, and his depictions of the History of the Acadians are also among his notable works.

Dafford's murals have been commissioned as public art projects that help to boost downtown development and pride in small communities. In 2009 he collaborated with former longtime employee Herb Roe on a poster project for the Zydeco Cajun Prairie Scenic Byway. The year-long project highlights many spots of interest in the three-parish region.

References

External links
 Official website
 Vicksburg Riverfront Murals
 Biography on Dafford, Mural City website

1951 births
Living people
American muralists
Trompe-l'œil artists
20th-century American painters
American male painters
21st-century American painters
21st-century American male artists
People from Lafayette, Louisiana
Artists from Louisiana
20th-century American male artists